Kevin McKee (born 10 June 1966) is a Scottish former footballer that is 5 ft 8 in tall, and has played for Hibernian, Hamilton, Partick Thistle and Stenhousemuir in the Scottish Football League.

References

External links 
Kevin McKee, www.ihibs.co.uk

1966 births
Living people
Footballers from Edinburgh
Association football fullbacks
Scottish footballers
Hibernian F.C. players
Hamilton Academical F.C. players
Partick Thistle F.C. players
Stenhousemuir F.C. players
Scottish Football League players
Bathgate Thistle F.C. non-playing staff